Ahmad Mendes Moreira (born 27 June 1995) is a Guinean professional footballer who plays as a winger for Greek Super League club PAS Giannina. Born in the Netherlands, he represents the Guinea national team.

Club career
On 4 April 2018, Mendes Moreira signed a contract with effect from 1 July 2018 until mid-2019 with FC Groningen. Previously, he had been playing for Kozakken Boys at amateur level.

On 12 August 2018, he made his official debut as a substitute for FC Groningen in the Eredivisie away match against SBV Vitesse, which ended in a 5–1 defeat.

He transferred to SBV Excelsior in July 2019 on a two-year contract.

In November 2019 Mendes Moreira was subjected to racism from opposition FC Den Bosch fans. FC Den Bosch initially tried to claim the sounds were their fans imitating crows, but later apologized for the claim.

On 6 August 2021, he signed a contract with PAS Giannina.

International career
Mendes Moreira was born in the Netherlands to a Bissau-Guinean father and a Guinean Loma mother. He debuted for the Guinea national team in a friendly 0–0 tie with Turkey on 31 May 2021.

References

Living people
1995 births
Footballers from Schiedam
Citizens of Guinea through descent
Guinean footballers
Guinean expatriate footballers
Guinea international footballers
Dutch footballers
Dutch expatriate footballers
Guinean people of Bissau-Guinean descent
Sportspeople of Bissau-Guinean descent
Dutch people of Guinean descent
Dutch sportspeople of African descent
Dutch people of Bissau-Guinean descent
Excelsior Maassluis players
Kozakken Boys players
FC Groningen players
SC Telstar players
Excelsior Rotterdam players
PAS Giannina F.C. players
Association football forwards
Eredivisie players
Eerste Divisie players
Tweede Divisie players
Super League Greece players
Expatriate footballers in the Netherlands
Expatriate footballers in Greece
Guinean expatriate sportspeople in the Netherlands
Guinean expatriate sportspeople in Greece
Dutch expatriate sportspeople in Greece